Odius is a genus of amphipods belonging to the family Ochlesidae.

The species of this genus are found in Arctic regions.

Species:

Odius carinatus 
Odius cassigerus 
Odius oclairi 
Odius polarsterni

References

Gammaridea
Malacostraca genera